Flyer was the eleventh studio album released by singer-songwriter Nanci Griffith. Released in 1994, it contained 15 tracks, mostly of original material. It was nominated for  the Grammy Award for Best Contemporary Folk Album at the 37th Annual Grammy Awards. The album had contributions from Peter Buck, Mark Knopfler, Emmylou Harris, Larry Mullen Jr., Adam Clayton, Adam Duritz, The Chieftains and the Indigo Girls.

Griffith wrote or co-wrote all of the tracks except "Southbound Train." She said that while much of her writing had been fiction, the songs on this album were more autobiographical. "This album is of songs that came internally from my life with no delays or fiction. They are of immediate reaction and inspiration."

Reception

Writing for AllMusic, the critic Vik Iyengar wrote of the album, "Although she falters a bit when choosing to tackle politics ("Time of Inconvenience"), this is her most consistent album of original songs in almost a decade."

Track listing
All tracks composed by Nanci Griffith except where indicated.
"The Flyer" – 4:23    
"Nobody's Angel" – 4:13  
"Say It Isn't So"  (Griffith, Harlan Howard) – 3:18 
"Southbound Train" (Julie Gold) – 4:32 
"These Days In An Open Book" – 3:33  
"Time Of Inconvenience" – 3:48
"Don't Forget About Me"  (Griffith, James Hooker) – 3:00  
"Always Will" – 2:42 
"Going Back To Georgia"  (Griffith, Adam Duritz, Brian Claflin) – 4:15  
"Talk To Me While I'm Listening" – 4:12
"Fragile" – 3:26
"On Grafton Street"  (Griffith, Fred Koller) – 3:58  
"Anything You Need But Me" – 3:08
"Goodnight to Mother's Dream" – 4:03
"This Heart" – 3:26

Personnel 

 Nanci Griffith - vocals, guitar
 Al Anderson – acoustic guitar, electric guitar
 David Angell – violin
 Eddie Bayers – drums
 Derek Bell – harp
 Fran Breen – bass harmonica, drums, cymbals
 Byrd Burton – acoustic guitar, electric guitar
 Andy Carlson – violin
 John Catchings – cello
 Frank Christian – acoustic guitar, electric guitar
 Adam Clayton – bass guitar, bass pedals
 Sonny Curtis – vocals, electric guitar, backing vocals
 David Davidson – violin
 Ron de la Vega – cello
 Bill Dillon – acoustic guitar, electric guitar, mandolin
 Adam Duritz – vocals on “Going Back To Georgia”
 Ramm Eberhard – French horn
 Martin Fay – fiddle
 Emmylou Harris – backing vocals
 John Hedgecoth – jug
 James Hooker – keyboards, harmonium, background vocals
 John Keane – electric guitar, steel guitar, gut-string guitar, backing vocals
 Seán Keane – fiddle
 Mary Ann Kennedy – percussion, backing vocals
 Jennifer Kimball – backing vocals
 Mark Knopfler – electric guitar
 Tony Levin – didjeridu, bass guitar, double bass, Chapman stick
 Sam Llanas – gut-string guitar, backing vocals
 David Mansfield – electric guitar, resonator guitar, mandocello, mandolin, violin
 Jerry Marotta – drums, percussion
 Pat McInerney – drums, cymbals, tom tom, percussion
 Pat McLaughlin – mandola, backing vocals
 Matt Molloy – flute
 Paddy Moloney – pennywhistle
 Larry Mullen, Jr. – drums, bongos, cowbells, percussion
 Kurt Neumann – gut-string guitar, backing vocals
 John Painter – electric guitar, slide guitar, baritone guitar, string arrangements, accordion, flugelhorn, bass guitar
 Eberhard Ramm – French horn
 Mickey Raphael – harmonica
 Amy Ray – backing vocals
 Michael Rhodes – bass guitar
 Pam Rose – backing vocals
 Emily Saliers – backing vocals
 Lee Satterfield – backing vocals, choir arrangement
 Dave Schools – bass guitar, 6-string bass
 Holly Tashian – backing vocals
 Tim White – keyboards
 Kathi Whitley – backing vocals
 Kristin Wilkinson – viola

References 

Nanci Griffith albums
1994 albums
Elektra Records albums
Albums produced by Peter Collins (record producer)
Albums produced by Peter Buck
Country folk albums